Lambda is the name of a series of Japanese carrier rockets. It consisted of the types Lambda 2, LS-A, LSC-3, Lambda 3, Lambda 4 and LS-C, developed jointly by Institute of Industrial Science of University of Tokyo, Institute of Space and Astronautical Science of Tokyo University, and Prince Motor Company, which merged with Nissan in 1966.

On February 11, 1970, the first Japanese satellite Ohsumi was launched using a Lambda 4 rocket.

Lambda series rockets did not have guidance systems, as they had the potential to be converted for offensive military use, thus interpreted as a violation of Article 9 of the Japanese Constitution. However, future Japanese launch vehicles, such as the H-II, were allowed to have guidance systems.

The Lambda 4 was launched nine times, though five were failures. The first launch of the Lambda 4S rocket took place on September 26, 1966, from Kagoshima. A fourth-stage attitude control failed resulting in loss of the vehicle and payload. The last launch date was September 1, 1974.

References

External links 
 https://web.archive.org/web/20121022140407/http://www.astronautix.com/lvs/lambda.htm

Solid-fuel rockets
Space launch vehicles of Japan
Rocket families
Japanese inventions